Akçay is a village in the central district of Şırnak Province in Turkey. The village is populated by Kurds of the  Botikan tribe and had a population of 1,336 in 2021. The three hamlets of Bürücek, Durmuşlu and Sarıyar are attached to Koçbeyi.

The village was depopulated in the 1990s during the Kurdish–Turkish conflict.

References 

Kurdish settlements in Şırnak Province
Villages in Şırnak District